Statistics of the Scottish Football League in season 1986–87.

Scottish Premier Division

Scottish First Division

Scottish Second Division

See also
1986–87 in Scottish football

References

 
Scottish Football League seasons